The Men's giant slalom competition of the Innsbruck 1976 Olympics was held at Axamer Lizum.

The defending world champion was Gustavo Thoeni of Italy and led the 1976 World Cup, while Sweden's Ingemar Stenmark was the defending World Cup giant slalom champion.

Results

References 

Men's giant slalom
Winter Olympics
Men's giant slalom